John Truman Stoddert (October 1, 1790 – July 19, 1870) was an American politician from Maryland.

Early life
John Truman Stoddert was born at Smith Point in Nanjemoy, Maryland on October 1, 1790. He was the son of William Truman Stoddert and Sally Massey. He graduated from Princeton College in 1810. He studied law at Litchfield Law School and Annapolis with Judge Alexander C. Magruder. He was admitted to the Bar, and entered into practice in Charles County, Maryland.

Career
Stoddert served as a major in the War of 1812 and as aide-de-camp under Philip Stuart.

From 1815 to 1816 and in 1820, he served in the Maryland House of Delegates. He also served as a senate elector from Charles County in 1826. From March 4, 1833 to March 3, 1835, he represented the eighth district of Maryland in the United States House of Representatives, as a Jacksononian Democrat. He was a member of the Maryland Constitutional Convention of 1867.

After his departure from Congress, he engaged in agricultural practices until his death. He was a slave owner.

Personal life
Stoddert married Elizabeth Gwynn on May 23, 1815, in Anne Arundel County, Maryland. Together, they had two daughters, Mary and Elizabeth.

He was the great nephew of William Smallwood.

Later life and death
Stoddert moved to Baltimore. He died on July 19, 1870 at his family estate, Wicomico House, at West Hatton Estate in Charles County, while visiting. He was buried at Wicomico House.

References

1790 births
1870 deaths
19th-century American politicians
People from Charles County, Maryland
Princeton University alumni
Burials in Maryland
Fendall family
Jacksonian members of the United States House of Representatives from Maryland
People from Maryland in the War of 1812